Miss Europe 1976 was the 38th edition of the Miss Europe pageant and the 27th edition under the Mondial Events Organization. It was held at the Castle of the Knights of St. John in Rhodes City, Rhodes Island, South Aegean, Greece on 5 June 1976. Riitta Inkeri Väisänen of Finland, was crowned Miss Europe 1976 by outgoing titleholder Maria Isabel "Maribel" Lorenzo Saavedra of Spain. The 1976 contest was held two years after the previous one instead of one year due to the 1975 contest being cancelled. The 1975 contest was originally scheduled to take place in Beirut, Lebanon but was cancelled due to the Lebanese Civil War.

Results

Placements

Special awards

Contestants 

 - Heidi-Marie Passian
 - Yvette Maria Aelbrecht
 - Andri (Antri) Tsangaridou
 - UNKNOWN
 - Pauline Davies
 - Riitta Inkeri Väisänen
 - Monique Uldaric
 - Karen Fastner
 - Melina Michailidou
 - Lucie Visser
 - Lara Sveinbergsdóttir
 - Elaine Rosemary O’Hara
 - Maria Rosa Chimenti
 - Monique Wilmes
 - Carmela Bonello
 - Bente Lihaug
 - Mary Kirkwood
 - Olga Fernández Pérez
 - Caroline Westerberg
 - Isabella Fischbacher
 - Sian Helen Adey-Jones
 - UNKNOWN

Notes

Withdrawals

Returns

Replacements
 - Christiana Kavroudaki was replaced by Melina Michailidou during the contest.

"Comité Officiel et International Miss Europe" Competition

From 1951 to 2002 there was a rival Miss Europe competition organized by the "Comité Officiel et International Miss Europe". This was founded in 1950 by Jean Raibaut in Paris, the headquarters later moved to Marseille. The winners wore different titles like Miss Europe, Miss Europa or Miss Europe International.

This year, the contest took place at the Luna Park de Ricard in Andorra la Vella, Andorra in May 1976. There 23 contestants all representing different countries and regions of Europe. At the end, Maria Teresa Maldonado Valle of Spain was crowned as Miss Europa 1976. She succeeded predecessor Vivianne Van der Cauter of Belgium.

Placements

Special awards

Contestants

 - Nuria Berruezo
 - UNKNOWN
 - UNKNOWN
 - Anne Korhonen
 - UNKNOWN
 - UNKNOWN
 - Nanny van der Kuyl
 - Torill Mariann Larsen (of )
 - UNKNOWN
 - UNKNOWN
 - Danielle Payan
 - Nina Kristine Ronneberg
 - Maria Teresa Maldonado Valle
 - UNKNOWN
 - UNKNOWN
 - UNKNOWN

Notes

Withdrawals
 

Elegance (Miss Elegance)

 Mediterranean

Returns

Debuts

References

External links 
 

Miss Europe
1976 beauty pageants
1976 in Greece
1976 in Andorra
Events in Andorra la Vella